The history of the Constitution of the Roman Kingdom is a study of the ancient Roman Kingdom that traces the progression of Roman political development from the founding of the city of Rome in 753 BC to the overthrow of the Roman Kingdom in 510 BC. The constitution of the Roman Kingdom vested the sovereign power in the King of Rome. The king did have two rudimentary checks on his authority, which took the form of a board of elders (the "Roman Senate") and a popular assembly (the "Curiate Assembly"). The arrangement was similar to the constitutional arrangements found in contemporary Greek city-states (such as Athens or Sparta). These Greek constitutional principles probably came to Rome through the Greek colonies of Magna Graecia in southern Italy. In the centuries before the legendary founding of the city of Rome, Greek settlers had colonized much of the Mediterranean world. These settlers carried Greek ideals with them, and often kept in contact with the Greek mainland. Thus, the superstructure of the Roman constitution was ultimately of Greek origin.

The early monarchy
The early Romans were organized by hereditary divisions called gens, or "clans", and until a very late date, these divisions were common to most Indo-Europeans. Each clan was an aggregation of families under a common living male patriarch, called a Patre (Latin: "father"). Each clan was a self-governing unit, and each member of a particular clan shared the same rights, and had the same responsibilities, as did the other members. Each clan governed itself either democratically, where each member was entitled to a vote, or aristocratically, where a group of clan elders decided matters. The simplest Indo-European political community consisted of a small number of clans known as a pagi, which aggregated together around a fortified point known as an arx. Each pagi was either purely democratic, or purely aristocratic. Long before the traditional founding of the city of Rome, a group of pagi had aggregated into a confederacy, with the city of Alba Longa constituting their common meeting place. At some point, however, the seat of this confederacy shifted from Alba Longa to Rome. The first independent settlement was probably on the Palatine hill, while independent settlements also formed on the Quirinal, Esquiline, Capitoline, and Caelian hills. At the top of each hill stood a citadel, which was used for the protection of the inhabitants. At a very early date, these settlements fused to form the city of Rome. Around this date, there was probably expansion to the south of the city, and along the left bank of the Tiber to its mouth.

The period of the kingdom can be divided into two epochs based on the legends. While the specific legends were probably not true, they were likely based on historical fact. It is likely that, before the founding of the republic, Rome actually had been ruled by a succession of kings. The first legendary epoch saw the reigns of the first four legendary kings. During this time, the political foundations of the city were laid, the city was organized into "Curia", the religious institutions were established, and the senate and the assemblies evolved into formal institutions. The city fought several wars of conquest, the port of Ostia was founded, and the Tiber River was bridged.

The early Romans were divided into three ethnic groups. By tradition, the first group was called the Ramnes. This group, what we know of as the Latins, inhabited the original hill settlements. The second group was called the Tities, and probably represented a Sabine settlement that was integrated into the larger community. The origins of the third group, the Luceres, was as unknown to ancient historians as it is to us today, although it may have represented Etruscan settlements. The families that belonged to one of these ethnic groups were the original "Patrician" families. In an attempt to add a level of organization to the city, these Patrician families were divided into units called "Curia". The Ramnes were divided into ten Curiae, the Tities were divided into ten Curiae, and the Luceres were divided into ten Curiae. According to legend, it was the first king, Romulus, who organized the city by the Curiae.

Some of the clans governed themselves democratically, with individual members of the clan acting as electors, while other clans governed themselves aristocratically, through a council of clan elders. When these clans merged to form a common community, both methods were used to govern the community. The vehicle through which the early Romans expressed their democratic impulses was known as a "committee" (comitia or "assembly"). The two principal assemblies that formed were known as the "Curiate Assembly" and the "Calate Assembly". The assemblies were the embodiment of the consolidated democratic tendencies of the early clans. To better reflect the form of direct democracy that was used by some of the confederated clans, the two assemblies were designed to mirror the ethnic divisions of the city, and as such, the assemblies were organized by Curia. The vehicle through which the early Romans expressed their aristocratic impulses was a council of town elders. Whereas each clan's council was made of elders from the leading families of the clan, the city's council was made of elders from the city's leading clans. This council became the Roman senate. The elders of this council were known as patres ("fathers"), and thus are known to history as the first Roman senators. The demos ("people") and the elders eventually recognized the need for a single political leader, and thus elected such a leader, the rex, who is known to history as the Roman king. The demos elected the rex, and the elders advised the rex.

The late monarchy

The second epoch saw the reigns of the last three legendary kings. The second epoch was more consequential than was the first, which was in part due to the significant degree of territorial expansion which occurred during this period. In addition, this period saw the development of the "Plebeian" (commoner) class, and their partial incorporation into the political structure of the city. Finally, this period saw the only foreign (specifically, Etruscan) kings, and the only period where kings ascended the throne due to heredity rather than election. Regardless of how true these legends were, it is likely that, as the legends suggest, a series of conquests did occur during the late monarchy. As a result of these conquests, it became necessary to determine what was to be done with the conquered people.

Often, individuals whose towns had been conquered remained in those towns. Their daily lives and system of government remained the same, and they simply lost their independence to Rome. Other such individuals, however, came to Rome. To acquire legal and economic standing, these newcomers adopted a condition of dependency toward either a Patrician family, or toward the king (who himself was a Patrician). Eventually, the individuals who were dependents of the king were released from their state of dependency, and became the first Plebeians. As Rome grew, it needed more soldiers to continue its conquests. The non-Patricians belonged to the same Curia as did their patron, while the army at the time was organized on the basis of the Curia, and as such, these dependent individuals were required to fight in the army. However, when they were released from their dependency, they were released from their Curia. When this occurred, while they were no longer required to serve in the army, they also lost their political and economic standing. To bring these new Plebeians back into the army, the Patricians were forced to make concessions. While it is not known exactly what concessions were made, one result of these concessions was that the Plebeians acquired the right to own land, and thus now had a stake in the success of the city. However, they were not granted any political power, which set the stage for what history knows as the Conflict of the Orders.

To bring the Plebeians back into the army, the army was reorganized. The legends give credit for this reorganization to the king Servius Tullius. Per the legends, Tullius abolished the old system, whereby the army was organized on the basis of the hereditary Curia, and replaced the old system with one based on land ownership. As part of Tullius' reorganization of the army, two new units were created: The army was divided into "Centuries" (centuriae), while future reorganizations were to be made more efficient through the use of "Tribes" (tribus). The Centuries were organized on the basis of property ownership, and any individual, Patrician or Plebeian, could become a member of a Century. The Curia, in contrast, were purely hereditary, and thus only Patricians (or their dependents) could become a member of a Curia. The organization of the army by Curia was replaced with an organization by Century, and these Centuries were to gather in a new assembly called the "Centuriate Assembly". At this time, however, the Centuriate Assembly had no political or legislative powers, but was simply used as a device through which the army assembled for various purposes (such as to hear announcements). In contrast, four Tribes were created, which encompassed the entire city of Rome, and were known as the Palatina, Suburana, Collina, and Esquilina. While new Tribes were to be created in the future, these future Tribes encompassed territory outside of the city of Rome. Membership in a Tribe, like that in a Curia, was hereditary, but the difference was that such membership was open to both Patricians and Plebeians, without regard to property qualification. All Romans were assigned to a particular Tribe on the basis of where they lived, and any individual belonged to the same Tribe as did his father.

The first Etruscan king of Rome, Tarquinius Priscus, succeeded the king Ancus Marcius. It has been suggested that Rome had been conquered by the Etruscans, however this is unlikely. The city was located in an easily defensible position, and its rapid growth attracted people from all over the region. The city's liberal policy of extending citizenship probably created an opportunity for a skillful leader to gain the throne. The reign of the first four kings was distinct from that of the last three kings. The first kings were elected. Between the reigns of the final three kings, however, the monarchy became hereditary, and as such, the senate became subordinated to the king. The fact that the monarchy became hereditary is obvious from the shared kinship between those three kings, as well as from the absence of an interregnum between their reigns. The fact that the auspices did not revert to the senate upon the deaths of those kings constituted a serious breach in the authority of the senate because it prevented the senate from electing a monarch of its choosing. This breach in the senate's sovereignty, rather than an intolerable tyranny, was probably what led the Patricians in the senate to overthrow the last king. The king may have sought the support of the Plebeians, however, the Plebeians were no doubt exhausted from their continued military service, and from their forced labor in the construction of public works. They were probably also embittered by their lack of political power, and therefore did not come to the aide of either the king or the senate.

See also

 Roman Kingdom
 Roman Republic
 Roman Empire
 Roman Law
 Plebeian Council
 Centuria
 Curia
 Roman consul
 Praetor
 Roman censor
 Quaestor
 Aedile
 Roman Dictator
 Master of the Horse
 Roman Senate
 Cursus honorum
 Byzantine Senate
 Pontifex Maximus
 Princeps senatus
 Interrex
 Promagistrate
 Acta Senatus

Notes

References

Further reading

 Cambridge Ancient History, Volumes 9–13.
 Cameron, A. The Later Roman Empire, (Fontana Press, 1993).
 Crawford, M.  The Roman Republic, (Fontana Press, 1978).
 Gruen, E. S.  "The Last Generation of the Roman Republic" (U California Press, 1974)
 Ihne, Wilhelm. Researches Into the History of the Roman Constitution. William Pickering. 1853. 
 Johnston, Harold Whetstone. Orations and Letters of Cicero: With Historical Introduction, An Outline of the Roman Constitution, Notes, Vocabulary and Index. Scott, Foresman and Company. 1891.
 Millar, F.  The Emperor in the Roman World, (Duckworth, 1977, 1992).
 Mommsen, Theodor. Roman Constitutional Law. 1871–1888
 Polybius. The Histories
 Tighe, Ambrose. The Development of the Roman Constitution. D. Apple & Co. 1886.
 Von Fritz, Kurt. The Theory of the Mixed Constitution in Antiquity. Columbia University Press, New York. 1975.

External links
 Cicero's De Re Publica, Book Two
 Rome at the End of the Punic Wars: An Analysis of the Roman Government; by Polybius
 Considerations on the Causes of the Greatness of the Romans and their Decline, by Montesquieu
 The Roman Constitution to the Time of Cicero
 What a Terrorist Incident in Ancient Rome Can Teach Us

Government of the Kingdom of Rome
Constitutions of ancient Rome